Juan Vicente Paredes Torrealba is a Venezuelan diplomat and Venezuela's current Ambassador to Russia and Abkhazia.

Paredes Torrealba has been ambassador to Russia since 21 June 2013.

On 3 September 2015, Paredes Torrealba presented his credentials to President of Abkhazia Raul Khajimba.

References

Living people
Ambassadors of Venezuela to Russia
Ambassadors of Venezuela to Abkhazia
Year of birth missing (living people)